Oatley Park is a  reserve located on a promontory jutting into the Georges River in the southern Sydney suburb of Oatley. It is bounded by the Georges River, Lime Kiln Bay, and Jew Fish Bay. The park includes natural bushland, waterways, a children's playground, and an oval. The park is a popular place for picnics, recreational, and sporting activities.

History
There is evidence of Aboriginal activity in the park including rock carvings and shell middens.

An area of 112 acres was dedicated for Public Recreation in the NSW Government Gazette on 25 March 1887, and the land was proclaimed on 29 May 1888 as a public park for recreation. It was initially known as Peakhurst Park, with Hurstville Council being appointed trustee in 1908. Even then it was recognised as being one of the few sizeable areas of waterfront land not privately owned. During March 1922 the name of the reserve was changed to Oatley Park.

During 1919 a Turkish Pine pinus brutia was planted near the main entrance, from a seed that was collected from the Lone Pine on the Gallipoli Peninsula, Turkey.

The sandy bay of Oatley Park had long been used as a swimming spot for local residents. The records do not show when the baths were built but they are known to have been in use in 1919, when Mortdale P & C Association applied for the beach as a bath site. The Oatley Swimming Club was founded in 1927.

During the depression of the 1930s, considerable work was done there under the Unemployment Relief Scheme. The scenic road was constructed around the river foreshores (as part of a wider scheme never completed). At the same time, the kiosk and eye-catching castellated tower were built as an attraction for visitors. Several paths and scenic lookouts were also formed, giving excellent views over the river.

In July 1942, the 26th Field Company of the Royal Australian Engineers was moved from Carss Park to Oatley Park. Several temporary structures were assembled to accommodate about 250 soldiers, including a mess tent, kitchen, shower blocks, an Aldershot oven, and storehouse. By January 1943, after only 6 months, most of these soldiers had joined the AIF for service in New Guinea so the 26th Field Company was disbanded. They were then replaced by the Tasmanian 12th Field Company, RAE, which was stationed there for 10 weeks. The concrete floor of a kitchen, ordinance store and shower block, some stone steps and a small concrete map of Tasmania can still be seen.

Fauna and flora
As one of Sydney's finest areas of natural bushland, Oatley Park is noted for its trees, shrubs and native flowers, as well as the river beaches and prolific bird life.
Over 310 plant species have been recorded. The park is an important regional sanctuary protecting a number of plant species not found anywhere else in the St George area.
107 bird species have been recorded. It is an important sanctuary for both resident and migratory birds.
Numerous reptile species have been observed including snakes and lizards
Possums are the main mammal species, but the park is also home to bats, swamp wallabies, and echidnas.

Features and facilities
Oatley Park is popular with visitors all year round enjoying a variety of recreational and sporting activities from picnics in Steamroller Park, swimming in the Baths in Sandy Bay to enjoying the many walking tracks and cycleways. The Oatley Park Castle is available to hire for private functions, from weddings to corporate functions.

Oatley Park has a number of prominent features:
Castellated Tower (the 'Castle'), with barbecue area and upper lookout
Oatley Park Oval, home to cricket and soccer clubs
Steamroller Park, containing an historic steamroller and children's playground
Sandy Bay, with pier and swimming enclosure containing Oatley Baths and home to Oatley Swimming Club
Lime Kiln Wetlands, featuring mangroves and a series of ponds populated by ducks and other water birds
Myra Wall Garden, constructed in 1964 to honour a local conservationist
Websters and Hills Peak Lookouts, with views over Jew Fish Bay and Lime Kiln Bay
Draculas Canteen, a large rock overhang

See also
 Oatley Pleasure Grounds
Oatley Point Reserve
 Mortdale Memorial Park
 Parks in Sydney

References

Parks in Sydney